SPT may refer to:

Organisations
 Sony Pictures Television, an American television production and distribution company owned by Sony
 Society for Philosophy and Technology
 Strathclyde Partnership for Transport, Scotland
 Sunpentown, a Taiwanese appliance manufacturer

Science and technology
 Septic pelvic thrombophlebitis, a postpartum complication
 Serine C-palmitoyltransferase, an enzyme catalyst
 Shortest processing time in single machine scheduling
 Single-particle tracking within a medium
Skin prick test, in diagnosis of allergies
 South Pole Telescope
 Standard penetration test, used to measure soil properties
 Stationary Plasma Thruster, for spacecraft
 Symmetry-protected topological order, in zero-temperature matter

Mathematics
 Shortest-path tree, a type of graph
 Spt function or smallest parts function, related to partition function

Other uses
 Stockport railway station (station code)
 Stochastic portfolio theory
 Super Powered Tracer, in anime Blue Comet SPT Layzner
 Substantial Presence Test, US criterion for residency